Mauro Francaviglia (Torino, 22 June 1953 – Arcavacata, 24 June 2013) was an Italian mathematician.

He was a professor at University of Torino and he worked mainly on geometric methods applied to mechanics, mathematical physics and general relativity.

Biography
Francaviglia obtained a degree in Mathematics at University of Torino in 1975 under the supervision of Dionigi Galletto. In the same university, he was a fellow of the CNR (the Italian National Research Council) from 1975 to 1978 and a teaching assistant from 1978 to 1980.

He became full Professor at University of Torino in 1980, when he was 27 years old (the youngest full professor in his discipline). He spent the last years of his life at the University of Calabria, in Arcavacata di Rende.

Besides his scientific activities, Francaviglia was a prominent philatelist.

Research 
Francaviglia's scientific interests covered a wide range of topics, including the application of differential geometry in mathematical physics, classical mechanics, general relativity and field theories, calculus of variations, symmetries and conservation laws, quantization and thermodynamics.

He was author of over 250 papers, three monographs and 11 encyclopaedia long entries, and he supervised 6 PhD students.

He was member of the Scientific Council of the INdAM National Group for Mathematical Physics (GNFM) (1980–1996) and life member of the International Society on General Relativity. In 1990 he founded the Italian Society for General Relativity and Gravitation (SIGRAV), of which he was president for two terms (1992–1996 and 2008–2012). He also served as a member of the Board of the International Society on General Relativity and Gravitation (IGRG) for nine years (1986–1995).

Francaviglia was co-founder (1984) and Managing Editor of Journal of Geometry and Physics, Associate Editor of the Journal of General Relativity and Gravitation since 1999 and Managing Editor of the International Journal of Geometric Methods in Modern Physics. A special issue of the last journal has published a collection of scientific contributions from several Francaviglia's collaborators, presented in a workshop in his memory two years after his death.

Monographs
 Elements of Differential and Riemannian Geometry, Monographs and Textbooks in Physical Sciences, Lecture Notes 4 (Proceedings Summer School on "Geometrical Methods in Theoretical Physics", Ferrara 1987), Bibliopolis, Napoli, (1988), 
 Relativistic Theories (The Variational Formulation), XIII Scuola Estiva di Fisica Matematica, Ravello 1988, Quaderni del CNR, Gruppo Nazionale di Fisica Matematica, (1991).
 (with L. Fatibene), Natural and Gauge-Natural Formalism for Classical Field Theories: A Geometric Perspective including Spinors and Gauge Theories, Kluwer Academic Publishers, Dordrecht, The Netherlands, (2003). ,

References

External links

Associazione culturale "Mauro Francaviglia"

1953 births
2013 deaths
Differential geometers
Italian relativity theorists
20th-century Italian mathematicians
21st-century Italian mathematicians
University of Turin alumni
Academic staff of the University of Turin
Scientists from Turin
People from Rende